Dr. Elizabeth "Liz" Ashton (born 16 March 1950) was a member of the Canadian Equestrian Team for Eventing, best known for captaining Canada's gold medal team at the 1978 Eventing World Championship. She was also chosen for Canada's team at the 1980 Summer Olympics, but did not compete due to the Canadian Olympic Committee's decision to boycott those Games. She did compete at the 1984 Summer Olympics.

Ashton has also served as president of Victoria's Camosun College since 1994.

She was awarded the 125th Anniversary of the Confederation Medal in 1992 and the Majesty Queen Elizabeth's Golden Jubilee medal in 2003.

References

External links
 
 
 
 
 

1950 births
Living people
Canadian female equestrians
Equestrians at the 1984 Summer Olympics
Event riders
Olympic equestrians of Canada
Canadian show jumping riders
Equestrians at the 1975 Pan American Games
Pan American Games medalists in equestrian
Pan American Games silver medalists for Canada
Medalists at the 1975 Pan American Games
21st-century Canadian women
20th-century Canadian women